Statistics of Nadeshiko.League in the 2009 season. Urawa Reds Ladies won the championship.

Division 1

Result

League awards

Best player

Top scorers

Best eleven

Best young player

Division 2

Result 

 Best Player: Yoshie Kasazaki, AS Elfen Sayama F.C.

Promotion/relegation series

Division 1 promotion/relegation series 

 Fukuoka J. Anclas Promoted for Division 1 in 2010 Season.
 Speranza F.C. Takatsuki Relegated to Division 2 in 2010 Season.

Division 2 Promotion series

Block A 

 Nippon Sport Science University L.S.C.,Shizuoka Sangyo University Iwata Ladies, JFA Academy Fukushima L.F.C. Promoted for Division 2 in 2010 Season.

Block B 

 Tokiwagi Gakuen High School L.S.C., F.C. AGUILAS, A.S.C. Adooma Promoted for Division 2 in 2010 Season.

See also 
 Empress's Cup

External links 
  Nadeshiko League Official Site
 Season at soccerway.com

Nadeshiko League seasons
1
L
Japan
Japan